Steven M. Sandler (born December 26, 1958) is an American inventor and businessman. He was born in Teaneck, New Jersey and studied math, physics and electronics. While at Venus Scientific in 1985, he invented and developed a magnetic modulation technology, which was used in the power supplies for the ALQ-184 radar jammer. The power supply offered many benefits over standard PWM techniques. He spent six years modeling power electronics for the International Space Station, including the US, Canadian, and Russian components.

Sandler founded Analytical Engineering, Inc. in 1995. He was the CEO until 2001, when it became AEi Systems LLC. In his current position at AEi Systems, Sandler is responsible for worst-case analysis, reliability analysis, and FMECA analysis of satellite and high-reliability power electronic systems.

Sandler has authored several books on power supply modeling and simulation, among them SMPS Simulation with Spice 3, Switched-Mode Power Supply Simulation with SPICE, and SPICE Circuit Handbook.

References

1958 births
20th-century American inventors
Living people